Kobi Musa (born April 18, 1982) is an Israeli footballer who plays for Hapoel Petah Tikva as a right back.

References

1982 births
Living people
Israeli footballers
Association football defenders
Maccabi Tel Aviv F.C. players
F.C. Ashdod players
Hapoel Ramat Gan F.C. players
Hapoel Ashkelon F.C. players
Hapoel Rishon LeZion F.C. players
Hapoel Nir Ramat HaSharon F.C. players
Hapoel Petah Tikva F.C. players
Liga Leumit players
Israeli Premier League players
Footballers from Tel Aviv